The Zuni (formerly spelled Zuñi) are Native American Pueblo peoples native to the Zuni River valley. The Zuni are a Federally recognized tribe and most live in the Pueblo of Zuni on the Zuni River, a tributary of the Little Colorado River, in western New Mexico, United States. The Zuni tribe lived in multi level adobe houses. In addition to the reservation, the tribe owns trust lands in Catron County, New Mexico, and Apache County, Arizona. The Zuni call their homeland Halona Idiwan’a or Middle Place. The word Zuni is believed to derive from the Western Keres language (Acoma) word sɨ̂‧ni, or a cognate thereof.

History
Archaeology suggests that the Zuni have been farmers in the general area for 3,000 to 4,000 years. It is now thought that the Ancestral Zuni people have inhabited the Zuni River valley since the last millennium B.C., when they began using irrigation to farm maize on at least household-sized plots.

Zuni culture is associated with Mogollon and Ancestral Pueblo peoples cultures, who lived in the deserts of New Mexico, Arizona, Utah, and southern Colorado for over two millennia. White Mound was one such settlement of pit houses, farming, and storerooms, built around 700 A.D., followed by the village of Kiatuthlanna around 800 A.D., and Allantown around 1000 A.D. These Mogollon villages included kivas.  Likewise, Zuni ancestors were in contact with the Ancestral Puebloans at Chaco Canyon around 1100.  The Zuni settlement called Village of the Great Kivas, was built around 1100, and included nine kivas. The Zuni region, however, was probably only sparsely populated by small agricultural settlements until the 12th century when the population and the size of the settlements began to increase.  The large villages of Heshot Ula, Betatakin, and Kiet Siel were established by 1275.  By the 13th century villages were built on top of mesas, including Atsinna on Inscription Rock.  In the 14th century, the Zuni inhabited a dozen pueblos containing between 180 and 1,400 rooms, while the  Anasazi abandoned larger settlements for smaller ones, or established new ones along the Rio Grande.  The Zuni did move from the eastern portion of their territory to the western side, and built six new villages, Halona, Hawikuh, Kiakima, Matsaki, Kwakina, and Kechipaun.  Halona was located 97 km north Zuni Salt Lake, and the Zuni traded in salt, corn and turquoise.  Hawikuh was claimed by Niza to be one of the Seven Cities of Cibola, a legendary 16th century wealthy empire.

In 1539, Moorish slave Estevanico led an advance party of Fray Marcos de Niza's Spanish expedition.  Sponsored by Antonio de Mendoza who wanted Niza to "explain to the natives of the land that there is only one God in heaven, and the Emperor on earth to rule and govern it, whose subjects they all must become and whom they must serve." The Zuni reportedly killed Estevanico as a spy, or for being "greedy, voracious and bold". This was Spain's first contact with any of the Pueblo peoples. Francisco Vásquez de Coronado expedition followed in the wake of Niza's Seven Cities of Cibola claim. Sponsored once again by Mendoza, Coronado led 230 soldiers on horseback, 70 foot soldiers, several Franciscan priests and Mexican natives.  The Spanish met 600 Zuni warriors near Hawikuh in July 1540, inflicting several casualties, and capturing the village.  Coronado continued to the Rio Grande, but several priests and soldiers stayed an additional 2 years.  The Chamuscado and Rodríguez Expedition followed in 1581, and Antonio de Espejo in 1583.  Juan de Oñate visited Zuni territory in 1598 and 1604 looking for copper mines, but without success.  Francisco Manuel de Silva Nieto established a mission at Hawikuh in 1629 with 2 Franciscan priests.  They completed a church compound in 1632, and established a second mission in Halona. Shortly afterwards, the Zuni destroyed the missions, killing two priests, and then retreated to Dowa Yalanne, where they remained for the next three years. The Spanish built another mission in Halona in 1643.

Before the Pueblo Revolt of 1680, the Zuni lived in six villages. After the revolt, until 1692, they took refuge in a defensible position atop Dowa Yalanne, a steep mesa 5 km (3.1 miles) southeast of the present Pueblo of Zuni; Dowa means "corn", and yalanne means "mountain". After the establishment of peace and the return of the Spanish, the Zuni relocated to their present location, returning to the mesa top only briefly in 1703.  By the end of the 17th century, only Halona was still inhabited of the original six villages.  Yet, satellite villages were settled around Halona, and included Nutria, Ojo Caliente, and Pescado.

Of the three Zuni missions, only the church at Halona was rebuilt after the reconquest.  According to Nancy Bonvillain, "Indeed, by the late eighteenth century, Spanish authorities had given up hope of dominating the Zuni and other western Pueblo Indians, and in 1799 only seven Spanish people were recorded as living among the Zuni.".  In 1821, the Franciscans ended their missionary efforts.

In 1848, U.S. Army Lt. Col. Henderson P. Boyakin signed a treaty with Zuni and Navajo leaders stating the Zuni "shall be protected in the full management of all their rights of Private Property and Religion...[by] the authorities, civil and military, of New Mexico and the United States."  Observing the Zuni in the 1850s, Balduin Möllhausen noted "In all directions, fields of wheat and maize, as well as gourds and melons, bore testimony to their industry."

The Zuni Reservation was created by the United States federal government in 1877, and enlarged by a second Executive order in 1883.

Frank Hamilton Cushing, an anthropologist associated with the Smithsonian Institution, lived with the Zuni from 1879 to 1884. He was one of the first non-native participant-observers and ethnologists at Zuni.  In 1979, it was reported that some members of the Pueblo consider he had wrongfully documented the Zuni way of life, exploiting them by photographing and revealing sacred traditions and ceremonies.

During the early 2000s, the Zuni opposed the development of a coal mine near the Zuni Salt Lake, a site sacred to the Zuni and under Zuni control. The mine would have extracted water from the aquifer below the lake and would also have involved construction between the lake and the Zuni. The plan was abandoned in 2003 after several lawsuits.

Culture

The Zuni traditionally speak the Zuni language, a language isolate that has no known relationship to any other Native American language.  Linguists believe that the Zuni have maintained the integrity of their language for 6,000-to-7,000 years.  The Zuni do, however, share a number of words from Keresan, Hopi, and Pima pertaining to religion. The Zuni continue to practice their traditional religion with its regular ceremonies and dances, and an independent and unique belief system.

The Zuni were and are a traditional people who live by irrigated agriculture and raising livestock. Gradually the Zuni farmed less and turned to sheep and cattle herding as a means of economic development. Their success as a desert agri-economy is due to careful management and conservation of resources, as well as a complex system of community support. Many contemporary Zuni also rely on the sale of traditional arts and crafts. Some Zuni still live in the old-style Pueblos, while others live in modern houses. Their location is relatively isolated, but they welcome respectful tourists.

The Zuni Tribal Fair and rodeo is held the third weekend in August. The Zuni also participate in the Gallup Inter-Tribal Ceremonial, usually held in early or mid-August. The A:shiwi A:wan Museum and Heritage Center is a tribal museum that showcases Zuni history, culture, and arts.

Ethnobotany
The Zuni utilize many local plants in their culture. For an extensive list, see the main article, "Zuni ethnobotany". Zuni have developed knowledge of local plants that are used for medical practices and religious rites.

Pottery

Traditionally, Zuni women made pottery for storing food and water. They used symbols of their clans for designs. Clay for the pottery is sourced locally.  Prior to its extraction, the women give thanks to the Earth Mother (Awidelin Tsitda) according to ritual. The clay is ground, sifted, mixed with water, rolled into a coil, shaped into a vessel or other design, and  scraped smooth with a scraper. A thin layer of finer clay, called slip, is applied to the surface for extra smoothness and color. The vessel is polished with a stone after it dries. It is painted with home-made organic dyes, using a traditional yucca brush. The shape and painted images depend on the intended purpose of the pottery. To fire the pottery, the Zuni used animal dung in traditional kilns. Today, Zuni potters might use electric kilns. While the firing was usually a community enterprise, silence or communication in low voices was considered essential in order to maintain the original "voice" of the "being" of the clay, and the purpose of the end product. Sales of pottery and traditional arts provide a major source of income for many Zuni people today. An artisan may be the sole financial support for her immediate family as well as others. Many women make pottery or, more rarely, clothing or baskets. Brown, black and red ornamentation can be found on traditional Zuni pots that are first covered with white slip. Common motifs are spiral scrolls edged with triangles, deer, as well as frogs, dragonflies and other symbols associated with rain and water. In addition to pots, Zuni produce owl figurines that are covered with white slip and painted with black and red motifs before firing.

Carving and silversmithing
Zuni also make fetishes and necklaces for the purpose of rituals and trade, and more recently for sale to collectors.

The Zuni are known for their fine lapidary work. Zuni jewelers set hand-cut turquoise and other stones in silver. Today jewelry-making thrives as an art form among the Zuni. Many Zuni have become master stone-cutters. Techniques used include mosaic and channel inlay to create intricate designs and unique patterns.

Two specialties of Zuni jewelers are needlepoint and petit point. In making needlepoint, small, slightly oval-shaped stones with pointed ends are set in silver bezels, close to one another and side by side to create a pattern. The technique is normally used with turquoise, sometimes with coral and occasionally with other stones in creating necklaces, bracelets, earrings and rings. Petit point is made in the same fashion as needlepoint, except that one end of each stone is pointed, and the other end is rounded.

Religion

Religion is central to Zuni life. Their traditional religious beliefs are centered on the three most powerful of their deities: Earth Mother, Sun Father, and Moonlight-Giving Mother. The religion is katsina-based, and ceremonies occur during winter solstice, summer, harvest, and again in winter.

Priesthood includes three priests (north, above and below), and Pekwin (the above priest) determines the religious calendar.  A religious society is associated with each of the six kivas, and each boy is initiated into one of these societies.

Shalako

Shalako is a series of ceremonial dances that take place throughout the night on or around the winter solstice. They are closed to non-native individuals unless there is a personal invitation by a tribal member. The ceremony also blesses the houses that were built during the year. The blessing takes the form of singing that accompanies six dancers who are dressed in Shalako outfits. These outfits can be as high as eight feet; the dancers wearing them represent "couriers of the rain deities come to bless new homes". The dancers move from house to house throughout the night; at dawn Saiyatasha performs a final prayer and the ceremony is complete.

In popular culture
In the novel Brave New World, a Zuni native named John comes to grip with sexual realities in the New State and how they differ from his own culture.

Gallery

Notable Zuni people 

 Emily Pinto, painter
 Percy Tsisete Sandy (Kai-Sa [Red Moon]), painter
 We'wha, weaver

See also
Zuni Reservation
Zuni language
Zuni mythology
Zuniceratops
Zuni Pueblo, New Mexico

Citations

References 
 Adair, John. The Navajo and Pueblo Silversmiths. Norman: University Oklahoma Press, 1989. .
 Cushing, Frank Hamilton. Jesse Green, ed. Zuni: Selected Writings of Frank Hamilton Cushing. Lincoln:  University of Nebraska Press, 1978. .
 Pritzker, Barry M. A Native American Encyclopedia: History, Culture, and Peoples. Oxford: Oxford University Press, 2000. .
 Wade, Edwin L. "The Ethnic Art Market in the American Southwest, 1880–1980." George, W. Stocking, Jr., ed. Objects and Others: Essays on Museums and Material Culture (History of Anthropology). Vol. 3. Madison: University of Wisconsin Press, 1988. .

Further reading
 Benedict, Ruth.  Zuni Mythology.  2 vols.  Columbia University Contributions to Anthropology, no.  21.  New York:  Columbia University Press, 1935. AMS Press reprint, 1969.
 Bunzel, Ruth L. "Introduction to Zuni Ceremonialism". (1932a); "Zuni Origin Myths". (1932b); "Zuni Ritual Poetry". (1932c). In Forty-Seventh Annual Report of the Bureau of American Ethnology. pp. 467–835. Washington, D.C.: Government Printing Office, 1932. Reprint, Zuni Ceremonialism: Three Studies. Introduction by Nancy Pareto.  University of New Mexico Press, 1992.
 Bunzel, Ruth L. Zuni Texts. Publications of the American Ethnological Society, 15. New York: G.E. Steckert & Co., 1933
 Cushing, Frank Hamilton, Barton Wright, The Mythic World of the Zuni, University of New Mexico Press, 1992, hardcover, 
 Herrick, Dennis. (2018) Esteban: The African Slave Who Explored America. University of New Mexico Press, hardcover, 
 Davis, Nancy Yaw. (2000). The Zuni enigma. Norton. 
 Eggan, Fred and T.N. Pandey.  "Zuni History, 1855–1970".  Handbook of North American Indians, Southwest.  Vol.9.  Ed. By Alfonso Ortiz.  pp. 474–481.  Washington, D.C.: Government Printing Office, 1979.
 Hart, E. Richard, 2000. "Zuni Claims: An Expert Witness’ Reflections," American Indian Culture and Research Journal, 24(1): 163–171.
 Hart, E. Richard, ed. Zuni and the Courts: A Struggle for Sovereign Land Rights. Lawrence: University Press of Kansas, 1995. .
 Kroeber, Alfred L. (1984). Zuni kin and clan. AMS Press. 
 Newman, Stanley S. Zuni Dictionary. Indiana University Research Center, Publication Six. Bloomington: Indiana University, 1967. .
 Roberts, John.  "The Zuni".  In Variations in Value Orientations.  Ed. by F.R. Kluckhorn and F.L. Strodbeck.  pp. 285–316.  Evanston, IL and Elmsford, NY: Row, Peterson, 1961.
 Smith, Watson and John Roberts.  Zuni Law: A Field of Values.  Papers of the Peabody Museum of the American Archaeology and Ethnology, Vol. 43.  Cambridge, MA: Peabody Museum, 1954.
 Tedlock, Barbara. The Beautiful and the Dangerous: Dialogues with the Zuni Indians, New York: Penguin Books, 1992.

External links

 Pueblo of Zuni official website
 A:shiwi A:wan Museum and Heritage Center at Zuni
 Pueblo of Zuni official Artist’s Art Walk website
 The Zuni Worldview
 Zuni Indian Tribe History, Access Genealogy
 The Religious Life of the Zuñi Child by (Mrs.) Tilly E. (Matilda Coxe EStevenson), from Project Gutenberg
 Pueblo tribe (Zuni is Pueblo)
 Collection of Historical Photographs of Zunis
 Quand les Katchinas dansent a Cibola. Mythologie et rites des indiens Zunis, 15 July 2008
 Zuni Breadstuff by Frank Hamilton Cushing, from Michigan State University Libraries – The Historic American Cookbook Project

 
Federally recognized tribes in the United States
Native American tribes in Arizona
Native American tribes in New Mexico
Puebloan peoples